Austin Rhone Clapp (November 8, 1910 – December 22, 1971) was an American competition swimmer and water polo player who represented the United States at the 1928 Summer Olympics and 1932 Summer Olympics.

Clapp grew up on the small island of Nauru, one of three sons of parents who served as medical personnel for the British phosphate mining operations on the island.
 
At the 1928 Olympics in Amsterdam, Netherlands, Clapp won a gold medal as a member of the winning U.S. team in the men's 4×200-meter freestyle relay, together with Walter Laufer, George Kojac and Johnny Weissmuller.  The Americans set a new world record of 9:36.2 in the relay event.  Individually, he placed fifth overall in the men's 400-meter freestyle and also competed in the preliminary heats of the men's 1,500-meter freestyle.

He attended Stanford University, where he was a member of the Stanford Cardinal swimming and water polo teams in National Collegiate Athletic Association (NCAA) competition.  As a college swimmer, Clapp won two NCAA national championships: the 1931 title in the 220-yard freestyle (2:18.0), and 1932 title in the 1,500-meter freestyle (20:02.2).  After completing his undergraduate degree at Stanford, he graduated from the University of California, Berkeley's law school.

At the 1932 Olympics in Los Angeles, California, he was a member of the third-place U.S. water polo team that received the bronze medal.

In 1976, he was inducted into the USA Water Polo Hall of Fame.

See also
 List of athletes with Olympic medals in different disciplines
 List of Olympic medalists in swimming (men)
 List of Olympic medalists in water polo (men)
 List of Stanford University people
 World record progression 4 × 200 metres freestyle relay

References

External links
 

1910 births
1971 deaths
American male freestyle swimmers
American male water polo players
World record setters in swimming
Olympic bronze medalists for the United States in swimming
Olympic gold medalists for the United States in swimming
Olympic medalists in water polo
Olympic water polo players of the United States
Stanford Cardinal men's swimmers
Stanford Cardinal men's water polo players
Swimmers at the 1928 Summer Olympics
UC Berkeley School of Law alumni
Water polo players at the 1932 Summer Olympics
Medalists at the 1932 Summer Olympics
Medalists at the 1928 Summer Olympics
American water polo coaches